Rahmatabad (also Romanized as Raḩmatābād) is a village in Garmsir Rural District, in the Central District of Ardestan County, Isfahan Province, Iran. At the 2006 census, its population was 501, in 123 families.

References 

Populated places in Ardestan County